Minster may refer to:
Minster (church), an honorific title given to particular churches in England

Places

England 
Minster, Swale (or Minster-in-Sheppey), a town in Swale, Kent
Minster-on-Sea, the civil parish
Minster-in-Thanet, a village in Thanet, Kent
Minster, Cornwall, part of the civil parish of Forrabury and Minster
Minster (Reading ward), a former electoral ward in Reading

Elsewhere 
Minster (river), a river in Switzerland
Minster, Ohio, United States
 Minster Square (Freiburg im Breisgau), in the centre district of Freiburg, Germany

Other uses 
Minster Machine Company, an American manufacturer of metalworking equipment
 Hilary Minster (1944–1999), English character actor
 Minster FM, radio station in Dunnington, York, England

See also 
 Minster Son, a British Thoroughbred racehorse and sire
 Minster School (disambiguation)
 
 Minister (disambiguation)